Sugar painting (糖画) is a form of traditional Chinese folk art using hot, liquid sugar to create two dimensional objects on a marble or metal surface. Melted sugar is carried by a small ladle made by bronze or copper. After it cools, it will be stuck to a bamboo stick and removed using a spatula. Three dimensional objects can be created by laying solidified sugar.

History

Sugar painting may have originated during the Ming dynasty when aristocratic families or government officials molded small animals made of sugar for religious rituals. This art form then became popular. After that period, as techniques improved, Chinese folk artists combined the molded sugar with other arts, like shadow play and paper cutting, to create a more diverse range of patterns. In Sichuan, during the Qing dynasty, further developments were made in production seeing the replacement of the molds with the now-common small ladle.

Nowadays, sugar painting is considered as a representation of the wisdom and creativeness of Chinese people. To inherit and develop this kind of art and food, the government listed it as Provincial Non-Material Culture Heritage. After the implementation of reform and re-opening policy, many famous sugar painting artists are invited to foreign countries, such as Japan and Spain to exhibit Chinese folk art.

Technique

The process of sugar painting includes four steps, including boiling down syrup, painting on a plane, sticking to a stick, removing from the plane. If a three dimensional figure is created, layers of pre-made two dimensional sugar painting are used.

Although techniques vary, normally the hot sugar is drizzled from a small ladle onto a flat surface, usually white marble or metal. The outline is produced with a relatively thick stream of sugar. Then, supporting strands of thinner sugar are placed to attach to the outline, and fill in the body of the figure. These supporting strands may be produced with swirls, zig-zags, or other patterns. Finally, when completed, a thin wooden stick, used to hold the figure, is attached in two or more places with more sugar. Then, while still warm and pliable, the figure is removed from the surface using a spatula-like tool, and is sold to the waiting customer, or placed on display.

In 2012, automatic machines for making sugar paintings started to appear in the market. Once sugar is added, the machine is programmed to paint on a plane in a process similar to automatic engraving. It does not need any art skills or experience, and is easy to operate. There are hundreds of graphics than can be painted using this machine.

Folktale 
Some say that it is created by a Chinese writer, Chen Zi'ang (陳子昂), during Tang Dynasty. He loved to eat brown sugar, but he liked to eat it in a unique way that he can both appreciate like an artwork and enjoy like sweets. So he melted the sugar and cast the sugar into molds to form its shape. One day, as he was holding the sugar casting on his hand, the prince passed by and saw it. He asked for it and took it away. After he got back, the emperor saw it and thought of it as an interesting invention. He complimented Chen Zi'ang and gives it a name, “sugar pancake”. So it became a snack popular in the court. After he left the palace, he spread this technique in his hometown, located in modern Sichuan province. Because of the emperor's compliment, this form of art and food became popular quickly and developed as the sugar painting nowadays.

Objects

This snack is popular among children. Customers (especially children) usually select a figure by spinning the arrow on a wheel which will randomly land on popular objects. These objects include animals, like duck, fish, monkey, dog, bird. The subject of painting can be personalized as well. The common objects are usually objects that symbolize fortune or famous characters from Chinese classical novels. For example, artists can paint Chinese mythical creatures, Chinese gods, fictional characters from the Chinese opera (ex. warriors), plants (ex. Flowers), daily objects (ex. bicycles), and fortune symbols (ex. dragon and phoenix).Almost everything can be painted, depending on the skills and creativity of the artists.

Location 
Authentic sugar painting can be found in Sichuan province. But since it become more and more popular, it can also be found in Henan, Tianjin, Beijing, and so on.

See also
Chinese folk art 
 List of Chinese desserts
 List of desserts
 
Sugar people

References

External links
 
 Images
 Images
 Video

Chinese desserts
Chinese folk art
Candy
Articles containing video clips